The 2003 Stanford Cardinal baseball team represented Stanford University in the 2003 NCAA Division I baseball season. The Cardinal played their home games at Sunken Diamond in Palo Alto, California. The team was coached by Mark Marquess in his twenty-seventh season as head coach at Stanford.

The Cardinal reached the College World Series, finishing as the runner up to Rice.

Roster

Schedule

References

Stanford
Stanford Cardinal baseball seasons
College World Series seasons
Stanford Baseball
Stanford